Klauvaneset is a small peninsula in the northern part of Åsane in Bergen Municipality in Vestland county, Norway. It is the site of the southern part of the Nordhordland Bridge.

References

Peninsulas of Vestland
Neighbourhoods of Bergen